Josef Werndl was a famous Austrian arms producer and inventor. His most famous rifle design was the M1867 Werndl-Holub. He also owned the Steyr-Mannlicher from 1855.

References

See also 
Ferdinand Mannlicher another Austrian inventor

1831 births
1889 deaths
Firearm designers
Austrian inventors
People from Steyr